For members of the Belgian Federal Parliament (1999–2003), see:
List of members of the Chamber of Representatives of Belgium, 1999–2003
List of members of the Senate of Belgium, 1999–2003